Megan Kate Coleman is a  South African beauty queen who represented South Africa in Miss Universe 2007 in Mexico and Miss World 2007 in China. She was Miss South Africa 2006.

Early life
She has a Bachelor of Social Science degree (in Media, Communications & Marketing), and runs an image consulting business (Image Insured) as well as has her own clothing range (Seasons) in Hillcrest.

References

      

South African female models
Living people
1985 births
Miss Universe 2007 contestants
Miss World 2007 delegates
Miss South Africa winners
South African people of British descent
White South African people